Thompson Community School District was a school district serving Thompson, Iowa.

The independent school district of Thompson was incorporated in 1894. Thompson High School graduated its first class in 1900, and its last class in 1889. A horse drawn school bus was replaced by a motorized school bus in 1909.

On July 1, 1989, Thompson entered into a whole grade-sharing arrangement with the Buffalo Center–Rake, Lakota and the Titonka school districts; earlier that year those districts, plus the neighboring Woden–Crystal Lake Community School District, held discussions about a comprehensive plan for their region. In 1992, the Buffalo Center–Rake and Lakota districts merged into the Buffalo Center–Rake–Lakota district. The whole grade-sharing relationship continued among Buffalo Center-Rake, Thompson, and Titonka, with the agreement to last for three years.

While the successor district and Thompson attempted a merge, the Titonka district chose not to pursue a merger with them. In November, 1994, the residents of the Buffalo Center–Rake–Lakota school district and the Thompson school district voted on whether they should consolidate into a single district. Meanwhile, the Titonka school district began whole-grade sharing with Woden-Crystal Lake. The residents of the Thompson district voted down that merger. Despite the failure, the Buffalo Center–Rake–Lakota and Thompson districts continued grade-sharing for the 1995–1996 school year. In November 1995, the second merger referendum for Buffalo Center–Rake–Lakota and Thompson occurred; this one succeeded. On July 1, 1996, it finally merged with Buffalo Center–Rake–Lakota, to become the North Iowa Community School District.

References

Notes

Defunct school districts in Iowa
Education in Winnebago County, Iowa
1996 disestablishments in the United States
Educational institutions disestablished in 1996